Monneus longiventris is a species of beetle in the family Cerambycidae, the only species in the genus Monneus.

References

Rhinotragini
Monotypic beetle genera